James McPhie (25 August 1920 – 24 February 2002) was a Scottish footballer who played for and managed Falkirk. He played as a full-back for Falkirk either side of the Second World War, with guest appearances for Preston North End and Reading. McPhie played in one wartime international for Scotland in November 1945 (the war had ended, but official competitions had yet to resume), and represented the Scottish League once, in 1948. He retired as a player in 1953.

After serving the club as a coach, McPhie managed Falkirk for seven games in early 1957 on a caretaker basis, after Bob Shankly moved to Dundee. He was replaced by Reg Smith.

References

1920 births
2002 deaths
Footballers from Falkirk (council area)
Scottish footballers
Association football fullbacks
Falkirk F.C. players
Preston North End F.C. wartime guest players
Reading F.C. wartime guest players
Scottish Football League players
Scottish Football League representative players
Scottish football managers
Falkirk F.C. non-playing staff
Falkirk F.C. managers
Scottish Football League managers
Scotland wartime international footballers